Parak may refer to:
 Parak, Bushehr
 Parak, Fars
 Parak, Jahrom, Fars Province
 Parak, Lali, Khuzestan Province